Phir Bhi Dil Hai Hindustani (Translation: Yet The Heart Is Indian) is an Indian television patriotic sitcom that premiered on DD National on 10 October 2003 and ran for two seasons from 2003 to 2006. Phir Bhi Dil Hai Hindustani was created by Nirja Guleri. The series was written and directed by Shrey Guleri.

Phir Bhi Dil Hai Hindustani chronicles the family of Bharat Bhushan, a perfect patriot. Bharat’s (Translation: India's) family includes his three sons – Om, Jai, Jagdish, his three daughters-in-law – Ganga, Jamuna, Saraswati and his four grandchildren – Ram, Shyam, Munna and Munni, all of whom live in a house named Bharat Niwas (Translation: India House) and personify the multi – cultural diversity of India.

Phir Bhi Dil Hai Hindustani featured an ensemble cast including Upasana Singh, Bhavana Balsavar, Sudhir Pandey, Tushar Dalvi and Aashish Kaul. Notable stars outside the main cast include Jay Bhanushali, Sumeet Raghavan, Swapnil Joshi, Arjun (Firoz Khan), Naveen Bawa, Vishal Singh, Muskaan Mihani, Lilliput, Krutika Desai and the veteran Kamini Kaushal.

Premise 
Bharat Niwas (Translation: India House) is a home that is the epitome of the ethos and culture of India. Bharat Bhushan, the patriarch of the family, is the perfect patriot who believes more in what you can do for your country rather than what the country can do for you. His family, consisting of his three sons (Om, Jai and Jagdish), three daughters-in-law (Ganga, Jamuna and Saraswati) and four grandchildren (Ram, Shyam, Munna and Munni), personifies the multi-cultural diversity of India with divergent views on issues relating to the society and the nation. Here lies the eternal conflict in Bharat Niwas – the embodiment of India!

The narrative stands the test of time as the issues are universally relevant and will continue to resonate with viewers for all time to come. Episodes are packed with super-sized laughs, heart-warming moments, drama, romance, action and most importantly, the sublime feeling of pride in being an Indian! The show imparts food-for-thought and inspires the viewer to become a catalyst for change, nationwide.

Cast

Main
 Sudhir Pandey as Bharat
 Tushar Dalvi as Om
 Jiten Lalwani as Jai
 Dharmesh Vyas / Aashish Kaul as Jagdish
 Upasana Singh as Ganga
 Sheetal Shah as Jamuna
 Bhavana Balsavar as Saraswati
 Mickey Dhamejani as Ram 
 Mickey Dhamejani as Shyam
 Hardik Gujjar as Munna
 Pallak Razdan as Munni
 Suhasi Goradia as Anjali (Season 2)
 Vishal Kotian as Various Characters (Season 2)

Series overview

Season 1
The First Season was named as Phir Bhi Dil Hai Hindustani.

Season 2
The Second Season was named as Dil Hai Phir Bhi Hindustani.

See also
 List of Hindi comedy shows
 List of programs broadcast by DD National

References

External links
 
 

DD National original programming
2003 Indian television series debuts
2006 Indian television series endings
Comedy-drama television series